Antequera-Santa Ana railway station is a railway station serving the Spanish town of Antequera, Málaga in Andalusia. A gauge changer exists near the station, allowing trains to operate seamlessly on both standard gauge AVE tracks and Iberian gauge mainline tracks.

History
The station was opened in 2006, originally as a terminus on the Córdoba–Málaga branch of the AVE network, which reached Málaga in 2007. In 2019, Adif began works to improve the lighting surrounding the station at a cost of €38,000.

Services
Along with the AVE service from Madrid to Málaga, Antequera-Santa Ana is served by Media Distancia trains to Algeciras, Almería and Seville-Santa Justa. In 2019, the Antequera–Granada high-speed rail line opened, providing AVE service to Granada.

References

Railway stations in Andalusia
Railway stations in Spain opened in 2006
Buildings and structures in Antequera